San Gabriele dell'Addolorata is a church located in Don Bosco district.  In 2015, Pope Francis created this church as the seat of cardinalatial Title Sancti Gabrieli Aperdolentis. It is dedicated to Saint Gabriel of Our Lady of Sorrows (1838–1862).

List of Cardinal Protectors
 Júlio Duarte Langa 14 February 2015 – present

References
 San Gabriele dell'Addolorata

Titular churches
Rome Q. XXIV Don Bosco